
Gmina Mszana is a rural gmina (administrative district) in Wodzisław County, Silesian Voivodeship, in southern Poland. The gmina also contains the villages of Gogołowa and Połomia.

Neighbouring gminas
Gmina Mszana is bordered by the towns of Jastrzębie-Zdrój and Wodzisław Śląski, and by the gminas of Godów, Marklowice and Świerklany.

Twin towns – sister cities

Gmina Mszana is twinned with:
 Budišov nad Budišovkou, Czech Republic
 Fryčovice, Czech Republic
 Griesstätt, Germany
 Houdain, France

References

Mszana
Wodzisław County